Urusha is an urban locality (a work settlement) in Skovorodinsky District of Amur Oblast, Russia. Population:

References

Notes

Sources

Urban-type settlements in Amur Oblast